The Grand National was a greyhound racing competition held annually at various tracks throughout Ireland.

The race was inaugurated in 1928 at Shelbourne Park and was shared between the two Dublin tracks of Shelbourne and Harold's Cross Stadium before being switched to the old Cork (Western Road) Greyhound Stadium just before World War II.

Kilkenny Greyhound Stadium hosted the race in 1960 & 1961 until Thurles Greyhound Stadium took over from 1962 to 1984. The competition returned to Shelbourne in 1985 for another 15 years but once again the nomadic race switched to Harold's Cross and was staged from 2001 to 2016 at the track. Following the closure of Harold's Cross, the event was switched to Cork in 2017.

It was the leading hurdle event in Ireland and an integral part of the Irish greyhound racing calendar. The event came to an end after the 2020 edition.

Past winners

+ No SP due to COVID-19 pandemic restrictions

Venues & distances
 Shelbourne Park (525yH 1928)
 Harold's Cross (525yH 1929–30, 1932, 1939, 1941)
 Shelbourne Park (525yH 1933–1938)
 Cork (525yH 1940)
 Kilkenny (525yH 1959–1961) 
 Thurles (525yH 1962–1984) 
 Shelbourne (525yH 1985–2000) 
 Harold's Cross (525yH 2001–2016)
 Curraheen Park (525yH 2017–2020)

Sponsors
2003-2006 (Baggot Racing)
2008-2010 (Vetsearch Recharge)
2012-2012 (SalacresRacingteam.com)
2013-2014 (Centra)
2017-2020 (Greyhound & Petworld Luxury Transport)

References

Greyhound racing competitions in Ireland
Greyhound racing competitions in Dublin (city)
Recurring sporting events established in 1928
Sport in County Cork
1928 establishments in Ireland
Recurring sporting events disestablished in 2020